The Maine Central Railroad Rumford Branch is a railroad line in Maine now operated as part of the Pan Am Railways system.  The Rumford Branch leaves the mainline at Leeds Junction and continues northwest up the Androscoggin River valley, passing through Livermore Falls and terminating at Rumford.  The branch comprises the remaining trackage of three earlier branches:

 The first 20.1 miles are the former Farmington Branch from Crowley's Junction on the Lewiston Branch through Leeds Junction and Livermore Falls to Wilton and Farmington.
 The next 11 miles are the former Livermore Falls Branch from Canton to Livermore Falls.
 The last 16.1 miles are the former Rangeley Branch from Rumford Junction on the Maine Central Back Road through Canton and Rumford to Kennebago north of Rangeley Lake.

Traffic over the Rangeley branch decreased after adjacent timberlands had been harvested. Summer passenger trains between Oquossoc and Kennebago were replaced in 1933 by a railbus built in the Sandy River and Rangeley Lakes Railroad shops. The Rangeley branch north of Rumford was abandoned and dismantled following damage in the 1936 flood.  The southern end of the Farmington branch from Leeds Junction to Crowley Junction on the Lewiston lower branch was dismantled in 1938.  The southern end of the Rangeley branch from Rumford Junction to Canton was dismantled in 1952.  The last passenger train to Farmington was in 1957.

Route mileposts
 Milepost 0: Leeds Junction on the Maine Central Back Road
 Milepost 7.3: Leeds Center
 Milepost 20.1: Livermore Falls former junction with the Farmington Branch north to the narrow-gauge Sandy River and Rangeley Lakes Railroad interchange at Farmington
 Milepost 24.8: Riley's large paper mill originating or terminating 17,000 annual carloads in 1973.
 Milepost 31.1: Canton former junction with the Rangeley Branch south through Mechanic Falls to Rumford Junction on the Maine Central Back Road near Auburn. 
 Milepost 47.2: Rumford and Rumford Mill originating or terminating 11,000 annual carloads in 1973.

History

The Androscoggin Railroad was chartered in 1848 to build a Portland gauge railroad to Farmington, Maine from Leeds Junction on the Portland gauge Androscoggin and Kennebec Railroad.  The railway was completed to Livermore Falls in 1852, and to Farmington in 1859.  The railway was then extended south from Leeds Junction to Brunswick to connect with the standard gauge Kennebec and Portland Railroad in 1861.  Conversion of the Androscoggin Railroad to standard gauge that year initiated a series of court battles ultimately eliminating Maine's Portland gauge rail network.  Maine Central leased the Androscoggin Railroad in 1871, and converted its own line to standard gauge in 1873.  The southern end of the Androscoggin Railroad adjacent to the Androscoggin River from Brunswick to Crowley Junction became the Lewiston branch of the Maine Central, while the remainder of the line to Farmington became the Farmington branch.

Farmington Branch
 Milepost 0: Crowley's Junction with the Maine Central Lewiston Lower Branch
 Milepost 4.3: Sabattus
 Milepost 11.2: Leeds Junction with the Maine Central Back Road
 Milepost 13: Highmoor
 Milepost 15.6: Curtis Corner
 Milepost 18.5: Leeds Center
 Milepost 21.3: North Leeds
 Milepost 23.5: Strickland
 Milepost 26.2: East Livermore
 Milepost 31.3: Livermore Falls junction with the Maine Central Livermore Falls Branch
 Milepost 33.5: Jay
 Milepost 37: North Jay
 Milepost 40.6: Wilton
 Milepost 42.9: East Wilton
 Milepost 47.1: West Farmington
 Milepost 47.8: Farmington interchange with the Sandy River and Rangeley Lakes Railroad

Lewiston Branch 
 Milepost 0: Brunswick on the Maine Central Lower Road
 Milepost 4.6: Pejepscot Mills
 Milepost 8: Lisbon Falls
 Milepost 11.7: Lisbon
 Milepost 14.8: Crowley's Junction with the Maine Central Farmington Branch
 Milepost 19.6: Lewiston Lower Station

The Buckfield Branch Railroad was chartered in 1847 to build a Portland gauge railroad to Buckfield from Mechanic Falls on the Grand Trunk Railway.  The railway was completed to Buckfield in 1849 and reorganized as the Portland and Oxford Central Railroad in 1857.  The railway was extended to Canton in 1870 and reorganized as the Rumford Falls and Buckfield Railroad in 1874.  The railway went into receivership in 1878 and was converted to standard gauge.  The railway was reorganized by Hugh J. Chisholm in 1890 as the Portland and Rumford Falls Railway.  The Portland and Rumford Falls Railway was extended north to Rumford Falls in 1892 and south to connect with the Maine Central Railroad at Rumford Junction near Auburn in 1893.  A branch line was completed from Canton to Chisholm in 1897 and extended to a connection with the former Androscoggin Railroad at Livermore Falls in 1899.  The Portland and Rumford Falls Railway chartered a subsidiary Rumford Falls and Rangeley Lakes Railroad in 1894 to access aboriginal forests north of Rumford.  The Rumford Falls and Rangeley lakes reached Oquossoc in 1902.  Maine Central leased the entire line from Rumford Junction to Oquossoc in 1907, and extended it to Kennebago. This line became known as the Rangeley branch when formally merged into the Maine Central in 1914.  The branch from Canton to Livermore Falls was designated the Livermore Falls branch.

Rangeley Branch

 Milepost 0: Rumford Junction on the Maine Central Back Road
 Milepost 4.1: Elmwood
 Milepost 5.9: Riccars
 Milepost 8: Poland
 Milepost 11.6: Mechanic Falls interchange with the Grand Trunk Railway
 Milepost 16.1: West Minot
 Milepost 20.2: East Hebron
 Milepost 24.8: Buckfield
 Milepost 29.5: East Sumner
 Milepost 31.5: Hartford
 Milepost 36.6: Canton
 Milepost 37.3: junction with the Maine Central Livermore Falls Branch
 Milepost 38.3: Gilbertville
 Milepost 43: East Peru
 Milepost 44.8: Peru
 Milepost 48.2: Dixfield
 Milepost 52.7: Rumford
 Milepost 58.5: Frye
 Milepost 62.2: Roxbury
 Milepost 66.6: Byron
 Milepost 70.5: Houghton
 Milepost 79.3: Bemis
 Milepost 86.1: South Rangeley
 Milepost 88.6: Oquossoc
 Milepost 99.4: Kennebago

Livermore Falls Branch
 Milepost 0: Canton on the Maine Central Rangeley Branch
 Milepost 6.3: Riley's
 Milepost 8.4: Jay Bridge
 Milepost 11: Livermore Falls on the Maine Central Farmington Branch

References

Maine Central Railroad
Maine logging railroads
Pan Am Railways
Rumford, Maine